Mount Early is a solitary volcanic cone,  high, standing  north of D'Angelo Bluff, on the west side and near the head of Scott Glacier. It was discovered in December 1934 from nearby Mount Weaver by the Byrd Antarctic Expedition geological party led by Quin Blackburn. It was visited by the Ohio State University geological party led by George Doumani on November 21, 1962, and was named by the Advisory Committee on Antarctic Names after Captain Neal E. Early, US Army, a member of the aviation unit that supported the United States Geological Survey Topo East survey of this area, 1962–63.

References 

Mountains of the Ross Dependency
Amundsen Coast